Taktagulovo (Tuqtağol) is a rural locality (a selo) and the administrative centre of Taktagulovsky Selsoviet, Bakalinsky District, Bashkortostan, Russia. The population was 409 as of 2010. There are 6 streets.

Geography 
Taktagulovo is located 37 km east of Bakaly (the district's administrative centre) by road. Kamayevo is the nearest rural locality.

References 

Rural localities in Bakalinsky District